A list of films produced in the Soviet Union in 1952 (see 1952 in film).

1952

See also
1952 in the Soviet Union

External links
 Soviet films of 1952 at the Internet Movie Database

1952
Soviet
Films